The University of Texas System (UT System) is an American government entity of the state of Texas that includes 13 higher educational institutions throughout the state including eight universities and five independent health institutions. The UT System is headquartered in Downtown Austin. Its total enrollment of nearly 240,000 students is the largest university system in Texas. It employs 21,000 faculty and more than 83,000 health care professionals, researchers and support staff. The UT System's $30 billion endowment (as of the 2019 fiscal year) is the largest of any public university system in the United States. In 2018, Reuters ranked the UT System among the top 10 most innovative academic institutions in the world.

Component institutions

Academic institutions
The University of Texas System has eight separate four-year academic institutions; each is a  university and confers its own degrees.

Addition of Stephen F. Austin State University 
On 29 November 2022, the Board of Regents of Stephen F. Austin State University announced their decision to accept an invitation to join the UT System. This decision occurred following an announcement at the start of the fall semester by SFA President Steve Westbrook that the board was considering joining a system. Stephen F. Austin is one of two independent public universities in Texas, alongside Texas Southern University. The Texas A&M University System, the Texas Tech University System, and the Texas State University System all extended invitations as well. The decision to join the UT System was made following a process that included faculty, staff, student, and alumni input. Stephen F. Austin's addition to the UT System will occur pending approval of the Texas Legislature during the 2023 session.

UT Brownsville and UT Pan American (UTRGV) merger 

On June 14, 2013, Texas Governor Rick Perry signed a law officially approving the creation of a new university in South Texas within the UT System and replacing UT Brownsville and UT Pan American. The initiative resulted in a single institution, including a medical school, spanning the entire Rio Grande Valley, with a presence in each of the major metropolitan areas of Brownsville, Edinburg, Harlingen, and McAllen.  On December 12, 2013, the UT Board of Regents voted to name the new university the University of Texas Rio Grande Valley. The new university began full operation in the 2015–16 school year.

UT Tyler and UTHSC Tyler merger 

In December 2019, the UT System Board of Regents unanimously agreed to merge The University of Texas Health Science Center at Tyler (UTHSCT) under The University of Texas at Tyler (UTT), creating a single unified institution. Two months later, the UT System formally announced its intention to establish a new medical school that will be added under the new unified UT Tyler administration. It will be the first medical school in the East Texas region.

On December 8, 2020, The Southern Association of Colleges and Schools Commission on Schools approved a plan to merge UT Tyler and UTHSCT. UTHSCT will retain its status as a health-related institution but will now come under the administration of UT Tyler. The UT System Board of Regents met in late December 2020 and took action on the implementation of the merger which began on January 1, 2021.

On January 4, 2021, the Board of Regents installed Dr. Kirk A. Calhoun, M.D. as president of the newly aligned UT Tyler and UTHSCT. As of January 4, these two institutions are officially one. On January 15, 2021 the institution publicly named the new line of executive leadership for the merged institution.

The medical school is expected to open in 2023.

Health institutions 
The University of Texas System has 5 independent health institutions. None are officially associated with any of the 4-year academic institutions, though some may have close relationships or special joint programs with them due to geographical location (Dallas–Fort Worth area institutions & San Antonio institutions) or historical relationships (UT Austin & UT Medical Branch at Galveston).

UT MD Anderson Cancer Center is one of the six schools at UT Health Science Center at Houston. Despite being officially associated under UT Houston, the UT System lists MD Anderson as a separate health institution due to its unique specialization.

Additionally, there are medical schools at UT Austin and UT Rio Grande Valley that are not directly affiliated with any of the independent health institutions. The third medical school organized under an academic institution in the UT System will open in 2023 under the UT Tyler administration.

Independent UT Health institutions

Medical schools within academic institutions

Attempted academic and health institutions and mergers 
Dallas–Fort Worth

In 2001 the 77th Texas Legislature proposed HB 3568, which would have merged all Dallas–Fort Worth UT System institutions (UT Dallas, UT Arlington, and UT Southwestern) under the name "The University of Texas at Dallas". UTD's Richardson campus would have been designated as the main campus, UTA's Arlington campus would have become a satellite campus, and UTSW's Dallas campus would have become the merged university's medical school. The purpose was to help the metroplex gain one unified flagship-level university, but the House Bill ultimately failed to pass due to objections from UT Arlington (which wanted to retain its identity as a separate university) and the lack of time to properly explain the complex process to state representatives.

San Antonio

Nine years later, in 2010, a study was commissioned to explore the possibility of merging UT San Antonio and UT Health San Antonio. Officials ultimately decided against it, citing significant costs, administrative challenges, and different university cultures. In 2016, an op-ed published in the San Antonio Express-News urged the UT System Board of Regents to reconsider their decision, but no further actions from the UT System have been taken since.

Houston

In 2015, the UT System purchased 300 acres of land in the Houston area for $215 million for the development of a research campus, spearheaded by then-Chancellor William H. McRaven. While the UT System publicly denied plans to build a new university on the land, the land acquisition drew criticism from the University of Houston System and several Texas State Senators, notably John Whitmire, focusing on the UT System encroaching on the UH System, given the UT System's access to the Permanent University Fund, as well as the process by which the land was purchased. In 2017, the UT System announced it would be cancelling plans for the Houston campus.

Students

Administration

The administrative offices are in Downtown Austin. The UT system approved moving the system headquarters in November 2012. Bonds from the UT System's endowment funded the construction of the new 19-story,  headquarters, which had a price tag of $102 million. The UT System planned to lease a portion of the facility for shops and other offices, with the approximately  remaining portion used for its own employees. The system headquarters opened on August 1, 2017.

In July 2018, the Pentagon announced it had selected the UT System administrative building as the headquarters for the Army Futures Command, a new organization committed to coordinating modernization efforts and integrating innovation across the Army.

The University of Texas System was previously headquartered in O. Henry Hall in Downtown Austin. The system headquarters complex previously included multiple buildings, which had 550 employees in 2014. These facilities included O. Henry Hall, Claudia Taylor Johnson Hall (named after Lady Bird Johnson), Ashbel Smith Hall, the Colorado Building, and the Lavaca Building,

In 2013 the UT system approved the demolitions of the Colorado Building and the Lavaca Building, and the new UT System headquarters was built where these buildings previously stood. The Texas State University System purchased O. Henry Hall in 2015 for $8.2 million; the UT System leased it and continued using it as its administrative headquarters prior to the 2017 completion of the UT System's current headquarters. The UT System leased the land containing Claudia Taylor Johnson Hall and Ashbel Smith Hall to Trammell Crow which is constructing a commercial property on the site that uses the facade of Johnson Hall. Ashbel Smith Hall was imploded on March 25, 2018.

Coordinated Admissions Program
The Coordinated Admissions Program (CAP) offers some UT Austin applicants the chance to attend the university if they complete their freshman year at another system school and meet specified requirements. Each institution in the University of Texas System sets its own admissions standards, and not all schools may accept a particular CAP student.

UT Dallas does not participate in the CAP program, and University of Texas at San Antonio, the largest recipient of CAP students, has stated that it will be phasing out the program within the next ten years.

See also
Permanent University Fund (Texas)
Education in Texas
University of Texas at Austin admissions controversy
List of colleges and universities in the United States by endowment over $1 billion

References

External links

Current Regents
Administration and Leadership

 
 
Educational institutions established in 1876
T
1876 establishments in Texas